The 3rd Nunavut Legislature began after the 2008 general election on October 27. The election returned 17 of the 19 non-partisan members with two deferred for other days. The last member returned in the general election in the Akulliq district on March 2, 2009.

Change of Premier
After the election the Legislative Assembly of Nunavut met and voted in a new premier. Eva Aariak defeated incumbent Paul Okalik to become the second premier in the history of the territory.

Membership in the 3rd assembly
A list of members returned in the 2008 general election and subsequent deferred elections.

Members elected in the 3rd general election

Membership changes

References

External links
Legislative Assembly of Nunavut official website

3
Legislature, 3
Legislature, 3